Get In Where You Fit In is the eighth solo studio album by American rapper Too Short. It was released on October 26, 1993 through Jive Records, making it his fifth release for the label. Recording sessions took place at Dangerous Studios. Production was handled by The Dangerous Crew and Quincy Jones III. It features guest appearances from Ant Banks, Ant Diddley Dog, Father Dom, FM Blue, Mhisani, Pee Wee, Rappin' Ron, Ronese Levias and Spice 1.

The album peaked at number four on the Billboard 200 and topped the Top R&B/Hip-Hop Albums chart. It was certified Platinum by the Recording Industry Association of America on November 16, 1994.

Critical reception

Rolling Stone reviewer gave the album 4 out of 5 stars, stating: "on his fifth album, Get In Where You Fit In, Short plays his usual blaxploitation character, only he ain't battlin' the man, he's on his way to get some. Between "I'm a Player", "Playboy Short" and "Blow Job Betty", Short sounds like he's getting more than Shaft, Sweet Sweetback and Superfly combined". Dimitri Ehrlich of Entertainment Weekly found that: "In Get In Where You Fit In, Oakland rapper seems to be operating on mental cruise control as he recounts gratuitous tales of life as a player in the streets and bedrooms of his hometown. Producer Ant Banks' antiseptic assemblages lack all the grit of the original recordings from which they were sampled. The result? N.W.A redux meets P-Funk lite". AllMusic reviewer wrote: "Although he tries to cop part of the current P-Funk-inspired gangsta rap, Too Short sounds lost and dated on the overlong, sample-reliant, grotesquely misogynist, and musically muddled Get in Where You Fit In". Veteran critic Robert Christgau gave the album a "neither" rating.

Track listing

Sample credits
Track 1 contains a sample of "Don't Fight the Feelin'" written by Kevin McCord and performed by One Way
Track 2 contains a sample of "Hollywood Squares" written by William Collins, Gary Cooper, and George Clinton, Jr., and performed by Bootsy Collins
Track 4 contains a sample of "Love Spell" written by Bill Curtis and performed by Fatback Band
Track 5 contains a sample of "Hollywood Swinging" performed by Kool and the Gang
Track 6 contains a sample of "Ring the Alarm" written by Clive Bright and performed by Tenor Saw
Track 7 contains a sample of "Shameless" written by Jean Roussel, Martin Simon, Tony Colton, and Wilson Pickett, and performed by Wilson Pickett
Track 8 contains a sample of "Freak of the Week" written by George Clinton Jr., DeWayne McKnight, and Pete Bishop, and performed by Funkadelic
Track 13 contains a sample of "Heart of Stone" written by Sylvester Levay and Stephan Prager, and performed by Silver Convention

Personnel
Todd "Too $hort" Shaw – main artist, mixing
Anthony "Ant" Banks – featured artist (tracks: 7, 8, 11), keyboards, drum programming, producer, mixing
Robert Lee "Spice 1" Green, Jr. – featured artist (track 8)
Mhisani "Goldy" Miller – featured artist (track 8)
Ramone "Pee Wee" Gooden – featured artist (track 8)
Russell "Rappin' Ron" Royster – featured artist (track 9)
Anthony "Ant Diddley Dog" Nelson – featured artist (track 9)
Leslie Calaway – featured artist (track 10)
Damani "Father Dom" Khaleel – featured artist (track 11)
Roniece Levias – featured artist (tracks: 10, 12)
FM Blue – featured artist (track 13)
Stuart "Shorty B" Jordan – lead guitar & bass (tracks: 1, 2, 5, 6, 8, 9, 12, 13)
Stan "The Guitar Man" Jones – guitar (track 3)
Ramon "Pee-Wee" Gooden – keyboards, live drums
Quincy Jones III – keyboards & producer (track 3)
Sean G – drums (tracks: 5, 10)
Kirk Felton – digital editing
Rob Chiarelli – engineering (track 3)
Tom Coyne – mastering
Nick Gamma – design
Victor Hall – photography
Randy Austin – management

Charts

Certifications

See also
List of Billboard number-one R&B albums of 1993

References

External links

1993 albums
G-funk albums
Too Short albums
Jive Records albums
Albums produced by Ant Banks
Albums produced by Quincy Jones III